Jude Uzoma Ohaeri is a professor of Psychiatry at the University of Nigeria, Nsukka. He is a fellow of the Nigerian Academy of Science, elected into the Academy’s Fellowship at its Annual General Meeting held in January 2015.

References

Living people
Academic staff of the University of Nigeria
Nigerian psychiatrists
Year of birth missing (living people)